The 2007 Kazakhstan Premier League was the 16th season of the Kazakhstan Premier League, the highest football league competition in Kazakhstan.

Teams
For the 2007 season, Zhetysu were promoted to the Premier League, replacing Energetik. Avangard also earned promotion to the Premier League, but due not having the financial capabilities they weren't promoted and as a result Kaisar were spared relegation.

Team overview

League table

Results

Season statistics

Top scorers

References

Kazakhstan Premier League seasons
1
Kazakh
Kazakh